Ilī-ippašra, inscribed DINGIRmeš-ip-pa-aš-ra, and meaning "My god(s) became reconciled with me", was a Babylonian who may have been adopted or apprenticed during the reign of Kassite king Kurigalzu I, ending ca. 1375 BC, and rose to become an official, possibly the governor of Dilmun, during the later reign of Burna-Buriaš II, ca. 1359-1333 BC (short chronology). He may have been a successor for Usi-ana-nuri-?, the viceroy of Dilmun who was attested in the cylinder seal of his grandson, Uballissu-Marduk.

Biography

A tablet in poor condition, alleged to have been found at Larsa but provided with a Nippur-provenance designation, details the adoption contract for Ilī-ippašra. His foster parent was Sin-napširra, son of Biriritum, who obtained him from Nazi-Šiqmi, “his master”, an obviously Kassite name. It was witnessed by a priest (Šamaš-nišu), a scribe (Izkur-Marduk) and two others (Kidinu and Išabtum) and was dated the 19th day of Šabatu, the year Kurigalzu built the Ekurigibara, the Enlil temple in Nippur (ca 1380's BC).

We next meet Ilī-ippašra some years later, when he is stationed in Dilmun, in his correspondence with Enlil-kidinni, who was the governor, or šandabakku, of Nippur, ca. 1342-1336 BC, whom he addresses as Illiliya, a familiar hypocoristicon. The Kassite administrative center was at Qal'at al-Bahrain, confirmed in 1995 by the discovery of a large cache of cuneiform tablets. Three letters have been found in Iraq, but one of these is illegible apart from the opening salutation and mention of a certain “royal command”. Much of the content of the other letters concerns the nefarious activities of the Aḫlamû, where the term is used perhaps as “Bedouin” might be today, as it was employed elsewhere as a synonym for 'Amurru' (MAR.TU.MEŠ), in the Middle Euphrates and in western Syria regions. Ilī-ippašra does not appear to be totally in control of the events unfolding around him. He greets his brother with “may Inzak and Meskilak, the gods of Dilmun, guard your life” and then speaks to him of their depredations:
       	

A series of madbasa, or date presses were housed in the palace, evidence of the importance of this agricultural activity and the earliest appearance for this equipment which was later to become common on the island.

He warns of travelers to Babylonia, a certain Iltānu who is to leave, and [Ku]tetu who has already left, of whom he says “for the departure of this [woman] of his, I am not responsible.” Much of the rest of the correspondence concerns his inability to complete the repairs to the palace, or É.GAL, or the decrepit local temple, projects which are beset by visions, possibly squatters, and other demands on his meager resources. The outcome of the dispute with the Aḫlamû was apparently violent as a massive fire gutted the complex and it was abandoned, never to be rebuilt.

He may be the individual who is mentioned as the father of Ninurta-bānī and Ba'il-Nabû who rented five slaves (Tukulti-Ninurta, Alšisu-abluṭ, Kidin-Gula, Ilanūtum, and their mother, Beltutum) from Enlil-Kidinni in a tablet dated to the sixth reignal year of Burna-Buriaš (ca. 1354 BC). Other fleeting references to a man of this name in undated tablets recovered from the same Nippur cache include an account record where he is listed as the father of Šenni, in other account documents, a roster, and a fragment of a letter.

Inscriptions

References

14th-century BC people
Kassite people
Dilmun